Archipetalia is a monotypic genus of Australian dragonflies in the family Austropetaliidae, 
The only known species of this genus is Archipetalia auriculata,
known as a Tasmanian redspot.

Archipetalia auriculata is a medium-sized and hairy dragonfly, with brown and yellow markings.
It is endemic to Tasmania, Australia, where it inhabits streams and seepages.

Gallery

See also
 List of Odonata species of Australia

References

Austropetaliidae
Anisoptera genera
Monotypic Odonata genera
Odonata of Australia
Endemic fauna of Australia
Taxa named by Robert John Tillyard
Insects described in 1917